Mandavalli mandal is one of the 28 mandals in the  Eluru district of the Indian state of Andhra Pradesh.

References 

Mandals in Eluru district